O. J. Simpson is the second solo studio album by American rapper Guilty Simpson from the Almighty Dreadnaughtz. It was released on May 18, 2010, via Stones Throw Records, and was produced entirely by Madlib. It also features guest appearances from Frank Nitty and Strong Arm Steady. The album peaked at #62 on the Top R&B/Hip-Hop Albums and #37 on the Heatseekers Albums in the U.S.

Track listing

Personnel
Byron Simpson – main artist, executive producer
Frank Bush – featured artist (track 17)
Jason Smith – featured artist (track 19)
Marvin P. Jones – featured artist (track 19)
Otis Jackson, Jr. – producer, mixing
Eothen Aram Alapatt – executive producer, A&R
Chris Manak – executive producer
Tommy Hoffman – mixing & recording
Kelly Hibbert – mixing & mastering
Jeremy Deputat – art direction & photography
Eugene Howell – management

Charts

References

External links

2010 albums
Guilty Simpson albums
Albums produced by Madlib
Stones Throw Records albums
O. J. Simpson